Spanish television may refer to:
Television in Spain
Televisión Española, the national state-owned public-service television broadcaster in Spain.